Herbert McGregor (born 13 September 1981) is a Jamaican long jumper. His personal best jump is 8.08 metres, achieved in May 2008 in Fort-de-France.

At the 2006 Central American and Caribbean Games he finished fourth in the long jump and won a bronze medal in the 4 x 100 metres relay. He also competed at the 2008 Olympic Games without reaching the final.

Achievements

References

1981 births
Living people
Jamaican male long jumpers
Athletes (track and field) at the 2008 Summer Olympics
Athletes (track and field) at the 2011 Pan American Games
Olympic athletes of Jamaica
Pan American Games competitors for Jamaica
Central American and Caribbean Games bronze medalists for Jamaica
Competitors at the 2006 Central American and Caribbean Games
Central American and Caribbean Games medalists in athletics
20th-century Jamaican people
21st-century Jamaican people